Adade is a surname. Notable people with the surname include:

Daniel Adade (born 1995), Ghanaian footballer
Foli Adade (born 1991), Ghanaian footballer
Nicholas Yaw Boafo Adade (1927–2013), Ghanaian judge

Ghanaian surnames